Nimbuzz was a proprietary cross-platform instant messaging and voice-over-IP provider and aggregator for smartphones, tablets and personal computers developed by Kuraakani Online Private Limited, with the origins of its technology dating back to the early 2000s. As of March 2013, Nimbuzz had 150 million users in 200 countries. By April 2014, Nimbuzz was growing by more than 210,000 new registrations per day. In October 2014, now with over 200 million users, New Call acquired 70% of Nimbuzz, valuing the app at $250 million. Under CEO Vikas Saxena's leadership from March 2015, the Nimbuzz suite of applications enabled users to enjoy free calls, instant messaging, social-network games, file sharing, and social networking on their mobile device. In addition, Nimbuzz offered discounted calling rates to most countries in the world.  The platform processed more than a billion call minutes and in excess of 100 billion messages a month.

Nimbuzz recently relaunched itself in a new avatar as one of the world's few pure "SUPERAPP's" with a chat, social networking, games, digital wallet, e-commerce, ott, & unique features all integrated in it.

Company history and background
Adopting the Nimbuzz brand from 2004 onwards, the company entered the mainstream Voice-over-Internet Protocol (VoIP) market in January 2007. In May 2008, the company launched its combined VoIP and instant messaging client. In January 2009, the company was selected as one of 100 winners of the Red Herring Global 100 technology industry awards for 2008.

Early stage investors over three rounds between December 2005 and July 2008 included SkypeMangrove Capital Partners, Naspers and HV Holtzbrinck Ventures, before its eventual majority acquisition by New Call in October 2014. MSM consolidated Nimbuzz with some of its other social media, digital currency, digital wallet, VoIP and instant messaging technologies in March 2017.

MSM is headquartered in Dubai with its principal development centres in Gurugram and New Delhi, India, after a relocation in May 2012 to be closer to the mobile Internet boom and rapidly growing smartphone penetration across South Asia. A fifth of Nimbuzz's users reside in India, and the app accounts for a quarter of the smartphone chat market in the country. The company has over 100 employees in its India development centres and about a further 30 in Kathmandu, Nepal. Additional offices are located in Rotterdam, the Netherlands, in San Francisco, California, in Sao Paulo, Brazil, and in Córdoba, Argentina, where a further software development team is located.

Revenue for the company, which in 2015 was reportedly approximately $30 million, comes from NimbuzzOut, e-commerce sales on N-World, from in-app purchases and subscriptions. An advertising and partners’ platform provides the majority of the revenue. The company also partners directly with telecom operators.

Features and functionality
Nimbuzz has been made available for Android, iOS, BlackBerry OS, Symbian, Windows Phone and Java ME mobile operating systems. It was one of the few instant messaging apps available for Java-based phones, and they account for 25% of Nimbuzz users. For non-natively supported devices, a WAP interface is available. For desktop computers, clients are available for both Windows and Mac OS X. It is available in Spanish, French, German, Italian, Dutch, Portuguese, Russian, Hindi and Arabic.

Nimbuzz users can send XMPP based instant messages, images, and share their location. Group chat is also supported. Voice-over-Internet Protocol calls between most Nimbuzz clients is supported, and there is a VoIP-to-PSTN (landline/cellular) service branded as NimbuzzOut. Nimbuzz can be set up with any valid SIP (VoIP) account.

Nimbuzz supported interaction with popular messaging services such as Twitter, Facebook Chat and Google Talk. In February 2012, Nimbuzz announced the discontinuation of support for ICQ, AIM, Myspace and Hyves because of the general lack of usage of these chat services.

Nimbuzz has an in-app portal called N-World, with applications, gifts, games, avatars and other virtual goods for sale. N-World has its own digital currency called Nimbuckz.

References

External links

Android (operating system) software
IOS software
BlackBerry software
Windows Mobile software
Symbian software
Java device platform
Communication software
Mobile instant messaging clients
VoIP software
2017 mergers and acquisitions